John Ketcham is a film producer.

Ketcham produced and directed I Accuse and produced The Hurricane. For which he was nominated at the Producers Guild Awards for the film The Hurricane, along with Armyan Bernstein and Norman Jewison.

Filmography
He was a producer in all films unless otherwise noted.

Film

As director

Television

Thanks

External links

References

American film producers
Living people
Year of birth missing (living people)
Place of birth missing (living people)